Leuila Mau'u (born 10 January 1992) is a New Zealand amateur boxer. He won a bronze medal in the super heavyweight division at the 2022 Commonwealth Games in Birmingham. Mau'u also competed at the 2020 Asia & Oceania Boxing Olympic Qualification Tournament.

Amateur titles 
Golden Gloves
2017 Heavyweight South Island Golden Gloves Championship
2019 NZ Golden Gloves Championship - Silver 
2022 Super Heavyweight North Island Golden Gloves Championship
Boxing NZ
2019 Super Heavyweight New Zealand National Amateur Championships
2022 Commonwealth Games
Bronze Medal Boxing at the 2022 Commonwealth Games – Men's super heavyweight

Boxing awards
New Zealand Boxing Awards
2022 Amateur Boxer of the year

References

External links
 
 
 

1992 births
Living people
Commonwealth Games competitors for New Zealand
Commonwealth Games bronze medallists for New Zealand
Commonwealth Games medallists in boxing
Boxers at the 2022 Commonwealth Games
New Zealand male boxers
Boxers from Auckland
Medallists at the 2022 Commonwealth Games